Boris Kondev (born 29 August 1979) is a Bulgarian footballer who currently plays as a forward for  team Filippoi Doxato (amateur club in drama Greece)  2018-

Career
Kondev previously played for Lokomotiv Sofia, Rodopa Smolyan and Pirin Blagoevgrad in the A PFG, for Irtysh Pavlodar in the Kazakhstan Premier League and for Turan Tovuz in the Azerbaijan Premier League.

References

1979 births
Living people
Bulgarian footballers
First Professional Football League (Bulgaria) players
Expatriate footballers in Germany
Expatriate footballers in Poland
Expatriate footballers in Kazakhstan
Bulgarian expatriate sportspeople in Kazakhstan
Fortuna Düsseldorf players
PFC Dobrudzha Dobrich players
FC Lokomotiv 1929 Sofia players
PFC Rodopa Smolyan players
OFC Pirin Blagoevgrad players
PFC Pirin Blagoevgrad players
FC Irtysh Pavlodar players
FC Montana players
FC Pirin Razlog players
Association football forwards
Bulgarian expatriate sportspeople in Azerbaijan
People from Kyustendil
Sportspeople from Kyustendil Province